Toofaan is an 2021 Indian Hindi-language sports drama film directed by Rakeysh Omprakash Mehra. It stars Farhan Akhtar, Paresh Rawal and Mrunal Thakur and premiered on 16 July 2021 on Amazon Prime Video.

Plot
Aziz Ali (Farhan Akhtar) is an orphaned extortionist in Dongri who beats up shopkeepers for money. He gets into a fight and goes to a hospital, where the doctor, Ananya Prabhu (Mrunal Thakur) criticizes him for being an extortionist and orders him out. One day, at a local boxing school, Ali comes across a video of Muhammad Ali and decides to start boxing.

He goes to Coach Narayan "Nana" Prabhu's (Paresh Rawal) boxing school but is defeated in a match because of his lack of technique. When he visits the hospital again, Ananya is kinder when she learns that he was taking care of and buying gifts for orphaned children, but later on, sees him rough up a person on the street. When he confronts her, she asks him if he wants to be a boxer or a gangster.

He decides to come back to Nana's boxing school after quitting his extortionist role and begins to train.

Eventually, he gets his boxing license, and starts winning matches, and is dubbed "Toofaan" by Nana. He also begins to form a romantic relationship with Ananya, and Nana angrily berates him when he finds out, thinking that Aziz is conning his daughter Ananya. He is also angry that Aziz is in a relationship with a Hindu as he is a Muslim. Nana also disowns Ananya and asks her to leave his house. Aziz and Ananya start looking for a place but find it difficult to live for two religious differences. The only house that they can stay in requires Aziz to return to his gangster role for his old boss, which he refuses. Instead, Ananya goes to a girls' hostel.

At his next boxing match, someone offers Aziz a large sum of money to lose, which he does, but then is uncovered, and receives a five-year boxing ban. After reconciling with Ananya, they marry, and sometime later, have a child, whom they name Myra. However, Nana stops speaking to Ananya, and does not want to meet the baby. Five years later, Aziz is an unfit father to Myra who receives his reinstatement boxing letter, but he trashes it because he does not want to return to boxing. After telling Ananya that he doesn't want to restart boxing, she goes behind him and gets his new boxing license.

On the way back, at the train station, there is a stampede at the zebra crossing/crosswalk, and Ananya dies. Seeing his boxing license, Aziz decides to restart boxing and get back in shape to fulfill Ananya's dream. Meanwhile, Nana begins to spend more time with Myra after Ananya's death. Aziz gets back in shape and wins a few matches, but in one match, the judge, Darmesh Patil (Darshan Kumar) is a former state champion who Aziz defeated earlier and pays the referee to let the other boxer win, who performs a series of under-the-belt illegal punches and wins, as the referee doesn't call it out.

Later, Nana meets up with Patil and secretly records Patil telling the story, who is fired from the boxing federation. Aziz then has a chance to fight again, but it facing Prithvi Singh (Gaganpreet Sharma), who is a famous boxer who sends his opponents to the hospital before the second round can begin. At first, Azis begins to lose, but Nana comes back to coach him and tells him to fight the match for Ananya, and Aziz wins.

Cast
 Farhan Akhtar as Boxer Aziz "Ajju" Ali
 Paresh Rawal as Narayan "Nana" Prabhu, Aziz Ali's coach and father-in-law
 Mrunal Thakur as Dr. Ananya Prabhu Ali, Aziz Ali's wife and Nana's daughter
 Hussain Dalal as Munna
 Supriya Pathak as Sister D'Souza
 Mohan Agashe as Bala Kaka
 Milind Pathak as Inspector Ramakant Shinde
 Imran Rashid as Mohsin
 Deven Khote as Merchant Sir
 Arhan Chowdary as Parvez
 Jatin Sapru as Commentator 1 at State Championship
 RJ Anmol as Commentator 2 at State Championship
 Akashdeep Sabir as Nirbhay Mallick
 Gauri Phulka as Myra Sumati Aziz Ali / Tuk Tuk
 Sahil Patel as Postman Shankar Sayaji Thakur
 Gaganpreet Sharma as Boxer Prithvi Singh
 Darshan Kumar as Dharmesh Patil (special appearance)
 Vijay Raaz as Jaffar Bhai (special appearance)
 Sonali Kulkarni as Sumati Prabhu, Nana's wife, Ananya's mother and Aziz Ali's mother-in-law (special appearance)
 Rakeysh Omprakash Mehra as IBF Secretary Anup Verma (special appearance)

Production
Filming commenced in Dongri on 26 August 2019 and was completed in March 2020. Darshan Kumar who plays the role of boxer Dharmesh Patil was trained by Hollywood actor Will Smith's trainer Darrell Foster. Boxer Neeraj Goyat , who is himself a professional boxer trained Farhan Akhtar for his role and also acted in the movie.

Release
Earlier the movie screening was announced to be released on 2 October 2020, which coincided with Gandhi Jayanti. However, it got advanced to 18 September 2020, which later on was indefinitely delayed due to COVID-19 pandemic in India. On March 10, 2021 Amazon Prime Video announced that the film would be released on their platform on May 21, but was later postponed after India faced a massive 2nd wave of COVID-19. Finally, the film premiered on 16 July 2021 on Amazon Prime Video.

Reception
Upon release, Toofaan received mixed reviews from the film critics, who praised Akhtar's performance but criticized the screenplay and the predictable plot of the film. On the review aggregator website Rotten Tomatoes, the film holds a rating of 53% based on 15 reviews and an average rating of 4.8/10.

Shubhra Gupta from The Indian Express gave Toofan a rating of 3.5/5 and wrote, "Toofaan is your underprivileged-underdog-to-boxing-champion tale whose arc is utterly predictable, but what makes this film such an enjoyable watch is the way it has been written and performed. You know exactly where it will go, but the journey pops with smart feints and jabs, and ends with a satisfying punch". Gautaman Bhaskaran from News 18 wrote "Farhan Akhtar is exceptional first as the Dongri 'Dada' and later as a mellowed lover, but unfortunately, the film clutters its canvas with too many issues". Anna M. M. Vetticad from the Firstpost gave Toofan a rating of 2.75/5 and described the film as "A promising – and long – tale of boxing, Islamophobia and love fizzles out in its third hour".

Soundtrack 

The music for the film is composed by Shankar–Ehsaan–Loy, Dub Sharma, Samuel–Akanksha and Daniel Lozinski while the lyrics are written by Javed Akhtar, D'Evil and Manoj Kumar Nath.

References

External links 
 
 

2020s Hindi-language films
Indian boxing films
Indian sports drama films
2021 drama films
2020s sports drama films
Amazon Prime Video original films